is a Shingon temple in the southeast of Nara, Japan. Founded in 992, it is the head temple of the Bodaisen Shingon sect.

History
The temple burned to the ground in the 1180 assault on Nara by Taira no Shigehira. Revived the following century, Shōryaku-ji fell into decline in the Edo period and most of the buildings of the garan have been lost.

Buildings
The Hondō and Shōrō are from the Taishō period (1916 and 1925 respectively). The sukiya-style reception hall from Enpō 9 (1681) is an Important Cultural Property.

Treasures
The honzon, a gilt bronze Yakushi Nyorai of the Asuka period, is a hibutsu. A Kamakura-period scroll of Yakushi and the Twelve Heavenly Generals is a Municipal Cultural Property and is kept at Nara National Museum.

Flora
The temple's Japanese Chinquapin forest is a Prefectural Natural Monument.

See also
 For an explanation of terms concerning Japanese Buddhism, Japanese Buddhist art, and Japanese Buddhist temple architecture, see the Glossary of Japanese Buddhism.

References

External links

  Shōryaku-ji

Buddhist temples in Nara, Nara
992 establishments
Shingon Buddhism
10th-century establishments in Japan
10th-century Buddhist temples